Carl Christiansen (19 January 1909 – 1 July 1990) was a Norwegian rower. He competed in the men's single sculls event at the 1936 Summer Olympics.

References

1909 births
1990 deaths
Norwegian male rowers
Olympic rowers of Norway
Rowers at the 1936 Summer Olympics
Rowers from Oslo